DXYP (102.7 FM), broadcasting as Mango Radio, is a radio station owned and operated by RT Broadcast Specialists. The station's studio is located beside Honda Motorcycles, Km. 5 Buhangin Rd., Davao City.

History
The station was launched in 2009 as a daily Christian program in DXUR and its sister stations in Cebu and Zamboanga. In 2010, due to its success, the stations became Mango Radio and carried a christian radio format. In 2013, Viva Live acquired the stations, prompting Mango Radio to migrate its broadcasts to online. In 2015, it returned to terrestrial air via 91.5 in Zamboanga and, the following year, 102.7 in Davao.

This frequency was formerly owned by Multipoint Broadcasting Network and operated by Rizal Memorial Colleges Broadcasting Corporation under the Radyo ni Juan network from 2012 to late 2013.

References

Radio stations in Davao City
Radio stations established in 2012